Meltwater is water released by the melting of snow or ice.

Meltwater may also refer to:

Meltwater (company), an online media monitoring company headquartered in California
Meltwater Entrepreneurial School of Technology, Accra, Ghana, a technology entrepreneur training program
Meltwater, Edmonton, Canada, a neighborhood in the Decoteau area of Edmonton